Dennis Taylor (November 13, 1953October 17, 2010) was an American musician, arranger, and author. Taylor had recording credits on saxophone (alto, tenor and baritone) as well as clarinet, and as an arranger.

Career
Taylor was born in Barton, Vermont. He studied music at the Berklee College of Music.

Career 
Taylor was best known for his recordings with Delbert McClinton, Clarence "Gatemouth" Brown, Michelle Shocked, Buckwheat Zydeco and many others, and for writing a series of instructional books through Hal Leonard Publishing, in which he discussed blues playing, jazz playing and phrasing. Taylor played on five Grammy nominated albums. He was a two-time nominee for the Nashville Music Awards, "Miscellaneous Wind Instrumentalist of the Year." He appeared on Austin City Limits, Country Music Hall of Fame 25th Anniversary Celebration, Texas Connection, In Concert, American Music Shop, and Crook & Chase. On April 30, 2010, Taylor appeared on Imus in the Morning.

A jazz educator, Taylor also analyzed other players' styles and offered tips for emulating and understanding work from the masters of the instrument. Some of the sax legends explained by Taylor include King Curtis, Stanley Turrentine and Eddie "Lockjaw" Davis. The final part of "Jazz Saxophone" features 17 solos over classic jazz standards (including Doxy, Easy Living, Maiden Voyage and So What) and a wide variety of forms and styles (minor blues, soul jazz,  time, and bebop). The theory lessons cover all the common major scale, minor scale, dominant, pentatonic chords and scales plus modes, as well as altered dominant scales and diminished options. Taylor also wrote other three other instructional books: Amazing Phrasing, Blues Saxophone and Jazz Saxophone.

Taylor was also an educator who taught at Johnson State College in Vermont, and taught private saxophone lessons in Nashville until the time of his death. In addition, Taylor volunteer taught at W.O. Smith Music School in Nashville, which provides lessons for students who can not afford regular private lessons, for eighteen of his twenty years in Nashville. He is survived by both of his parents, as well as his wife, Nashville songwriter and publicist Karen Leipziger.

Discography
Taylor's first solo recording, which received help from Kevin McKendree, also of McClinton's band, was completed shortly before his death. The recording featured saxophone, organ and drums, some of Taylor's original compositions, and also a guest appearance by Delbert McClinton. Details on the release of the recording have not yet been released. He appeared as a side-man on countless albums (see below for partial list).

Published works
Hal Leonard Tenor Saxophone Method Jazz Saxophone: Tenor (Hal Leonard Corp.) – 
Jazz Saxophone (Hal Leonard Corp.) – , 
Blues Saxophone (Hal Leonard Corp.) – , 
Amazing Phrasing (Hal Leonard Corp.) – ,

Session work (partial list)
Clarence "Gatemouth" Brown – Real Life (Live) CD – 1987 (Horn Arrangements, Tenor Saxophone)
Buckwheat Zydeco – Taking It Home – 1988 (Tenor Saxophone, Baritone Saxophone)
Clarence "Gatemouth" Brown – Standing My Ground – 1989 (Tenor Saxophone)
Buckwheat Zydeco – Where There's Smoke There's Fire – 1990 (Tenor Saxophone)
Various Artists – Best of Mountain State Live Vol. 1 – 1991 (Saxophone)
Michelle Shocked – Arkansas Traveller – 1991 (Tenor Saxophone)
Clarence "Gatemouth" Brown – No Looking Back – 1992 (Tenor Saxophone)
Buckwheat Zydeco – Menagerie: The Essential Zydeco Collection, Mango – 1993 Island Records, Inc.
Big Mike Griffin – Give Me What I Got Comin''' – 1993 (Tenor Saxophone)
Clarence "Gatemouth" Brown – Timeless, HighTone Records 8174, 2004
Earl Gaines – Everything's Gonna Be Alright, CD – 1998Big Blues Extravaganza! The Best of Austin City Limits – Sony Music Entertainment 489928 2 – CD – 1998
Roscoe Shelton – Let's Work Together (Alto Saxophone, Tenor Saxophone, Baritone Saxophone)
Eddy Clearwater – Reservation Blues – 2000 (Tenor Saxophone, Soloist)
Clifford Curry – She Shot a Hole in My Soul Again! – 2001 (Tenor Saxophone)
Eddy Clearwater – Rock 'n Roll City – 2003 (Tenor Saxophone, Baritone Saxophone)
Various Artists – Box of the Blues – 2003 (Tenor Saxophone)
Robert Gordon – Satisfied Mind – 2004 (Saxophone)
Hacienda Brothers – Hacienda Brothers – 2005 (Guest Appearance, Saxophone)
Webb Wilder – About Time – 2005 (Saxophone)
Al Garner – Get Out Blues – 2007 (Saxophone)
Eddy Clearwater – West Side Strut – 2008 (Baritone Saxophone, Tenor Saxophone)
Mike Farris – Shout! Live – 2009 (Clarinet, Saxophone)
Clarence "Gatemouth" Brown – Essential Recordings: Flippin' Out – 2009 (Tenor Saxophone)
Delbert McClinton – Acquired Taste – 2009 (Tenor Saxophone)
Murali Croyell – Sugar Lips – 2009 (Saxophone)
Mark Robinson – Quit Your Day Job – Play Guitar – 2010
Duke Robillard – New Blues For Modern Man, Shanachie Records – Shanachie 9017
Dennis Taylor – Steppin' Up, Kizybosh Records (Saxophone, co-Producer, Composer) – 2011
Big Joe and the Dynaflows – You Can't Keep a Big Man Down, Severn Records (Saxophone) – 2011
Earl Gaines – You Got the Walk'', (Saxophone) – 2011

References

1953 births
2010 deaths
American jazz tenor saxophonists
American male saxophonists
American writers about music
Musicians from Nashville, Tennessee
Jazz musicians from Tennessee
American male jazz musicians
20th-century American saxophonists
People from Barton, Vermont
Musicians from Vermont
Johnson State College faculty